Tim Allsop and Stewart Williams are a British writing and directing duo.

They met in 2005 working for Elisabeth Murdoch’s production company Shine Limited. Their first joint work was a Comedy Lab for Channel 4 starring Alex Zane which they wrote, produced, and directed. Since then they have written for a variety of comedy and entertainment shows for the BBC, ITV and Channel 4, as well directing music videos and commercials – most recently for the Guitar Hero brand.  In 2007 they began working on a pilot for Plus One in the Comedy Showcase strand for Channel 4 which they made with production company Kudos.

They have also written episodes for The Amazing World of Gumball and recently and written episodes for Space Chickens in Space, as well as developed the bible for Disney EMEA for the show as well.

Tim Allsop is currently a producer on Who Is America and Stewart Williams recently wrote an episode of Famalam.

External links
 
 
 Official Website for Plus One

British television writers
British television directors
British television producers